Ding Sheng (1913–1999) was a Chinese general and politician. He served as the Governor of China's Guangdong province from 1972 until 1974.

Ding Sheng joined the Chinese Communist Party in 1932. He was already an army officer with the Red Army. He participated in the Long March as well as the Second Sino-Japanese War, Chinese Civil War and Sino-Indian War.

He died in 1999 in Guangzhou.

References 

1913 births
1999 deaths
Hakka generals
Governors of Guangdong
People's Republic of China politicians from Jiangxi
Chinese Communist Party politicians from Jiangxi
Chinese Red Army generals
Commanders of the Guangzhou Military Region
Politicians from Ganzhou
People's Liberation Army generals from Jiangxi